Pericyma metaleuca is a moth of the  family Noctuidae. It is found in Africa and the Near East and is known from  Ethiopia, Kenya, Mauritania, Oman, Saudi Arabia, Somalia, Tanzania and Yemen.

It has a wingspan of approx. 24mm.

Subspecies
Pericyma metaleuca metaleuca Hampson, 1913
Pericyma metaleuca obscura  Wiltshire, 1980 (Oman)
Pericyma metaleuca mauritanica  Hacker & Hausmann, 2010  (Mauritania)

References

Ophiusina
Moths described in 1913
Moths of Africa
Moths of Asia